William Mearns Sinclair (born 14 October 1934 in Coatbridge) is a Scottish former professional footballer who played as a midfielder for Aberdeen, Falkirk, Huddersfield Town, Tranmere Rovers, Halifax Town and Stirling Albion.

In the early 1960s Sinclair moved to Australia where he played for Adelaide Polonia and APIA.

References

External links

1934 births
Living people
Scottish footballers
Association football wingers
English Football League players
Scottish Football League players
Aberdeen F.C. players
Falkirk F.C. players
Huddersfield Town A.F.C. players
Tranmere Rovers F.C. players
Halifax Town A.F.C. players
Stirling Albion F.C. players
Footballers from Coatbridge